The 1860 United States presidential election in Iowa took place on November 6, 1860, as part of the 1860 United States presidential election. Iowa voters chose four representatives, or electors, to the Electoral College, who voted for president and vice president.

Iowa was won by Illinois Representative Abraham Lincoln (R–Illinois), running with Senator Hannibal Hamlin, with 54.61% of the popular vote, against Senator Stephen A. Douglas (D–Vermont), running with 41st Governor of Georgia Herschel V. Johnson, with 43.22% of the popular vote.

Results

See also
 United States presidential elections in Iowa

References

Iowa
1860
1860 Iowa elections